Delvin Williams Jr. (born April 17, 1951), is an American former professional football player who was a running back in the National Football League (NFL). He was selected by the San Francisco 49ers in the 2nd round of the 1974 NFL Draft. A 6'0", 197-lb. running back from the University of Kansas, Williams played for the 49ers, Miami Dolphins, and Green Bay Packers in eight NFL seasons from 1974 to 1981. A two-time Pro Bowl selection in 1976 and 1978, Williams rushed for over 1,200 yards in both those seasons.

Work with Nancy Reagan
Shortly after retiring, Williams began a years-long collaboration with Nancy Reagan on her signature project to prevent teens from doing drugs called "Just Say No".  Delvin focused on providing advice to youth on preventing drug use.  In this capacity, he made many presentations with Mrs. Reagan.

Post-football career
On March 10, 2015, Delvin Williams launched a global internet sports radio show, LIFE AFTER FOOTBALL on MJWJ Global Radio Network. The one-hour talk show airs every Tuesday at 7:00 PM/CST, broadcasting live from Houston, Texas. It will explore a wide range of topics related to football focused on the athlete often unprepared for life after the sport. LIFE AFTER FOOTBALL will tackle a new topic each week and provide an open format for retired football players to voice opinions. The program offers a unique approach and perspective from a retired players point of view.

References

Living people
1951 births
People from Houston
American football running backs
Kansas Jayhawks football players
San Francisco 49ers players
Miami Dolphins players
Green Bay Packers players
National Conference Pro Bowl players
American Conference Pro Bowl players